Muhammad Ahmed Akram is a Pakistani blind cricketer who has represented his country in the inaugural edition of the 2012 Blind T20 World Cup where his team ended up as runner-up. During that world cup, he set the world record for the highest ever individual score by any blind cricketer in a T20I as well as in Blind T20 World Cup history(264)

References 

Blind cricketers
Pakistani blind people
Year of birth missing (living people)
Living people
Pakistani disabled sportspeople